Hanson is an unincorporated community and census-designated place (CDP) in Sequoyah County, Oklahoma, United States. It was first listed as a CDP prior to the 2020 census.

Demographics

References 

Census-designated places in Sequoyah County, Oklahoma
Census-designated places in Oklahoma